Snake is the fourth studio album by Bahamian folk musician Exuma, released in 1972 through Kama Sutra Records.

Reception

Upon its release, Lynn Van Matre of the Chicago Tribune called the album "Wholly weird and mostly wonderful." In a retrospective review, J. Chandler of AllMusic commended the album's cover artwork but wrote that the album's music content "is pretty indistinguishable from the rest of the low-budget drugged out hippie Hare Krishna rock-jazz chant music being made at the time."

Track listing

Personnel
Adapted from the album's liner notes.

 Exuma – lead vocals, guitar, background vocals, cowbells, calling bells, triangle
 Yogi Achmed Benn Mansel – background vocals
 Sally O'Brien – background vocals
 Tonice Gwathney – background vocals
 Barbara Simon "Omolaye" – background vocals
 Michael O'Neil – background vocals, congas, saxophone
 Michael B. Olatunji – talking drum, African congas, African shaker
 Michael Laneve – timbales
 John Russo – electric bass, violin, lead guitar (on "Don't Let Go")
 George J. Clemmons "Duke" – upright bass
 Jeffory Miller – set drums
 Stanley Wiley – piano
 Akinjorin Omolade "Juice" – lead saxophone, African drums
 Jerry Gongales – trumpet
 Carl Jennings – trumpet
 Cuchlow Eliebank – steel pan
 Dave Libert – piano (on "Don't Let Go", "Happiness", and "Sunshine")

References

1972 albums
Exuma (musician) albums
Kama Sutra Records albums